Timbellus fulgens is a species of sea snail, a marine gastropod mollusk in the family Muricidae, the murex snails or rock snails.

Description

Distribution
This species is distributed in the Indian Ocean along South Africa and in the Pacific Ocean along New Caledonia.

References

 Houart, R. (1988). Description of seven new species of Muricidae (Neagastropoda) from the south-western Pacific Ocean. Venus. 47(3): 185-196.
 Merle D., Garrigues B. & Pointier J.-P. (2011) Fossil and Recent Muricidae of the world. Part Muricinae. Hackenheim: Conchbooks. 648 pp. page(s): 133

External links
 

Muricidae
Gastropods described in 1988